Las abuelas (English title:The grandmothers) is a Mexican telenovela produced by Televisa and transmitted by Telesistema Mexicano.

Cast 
Prudencia Grifell
María Teresa Rivas
Irma Lozano
Jorge del Campo
Raúl Meraz
Ofelia Guilmáin
Maricruz Olivier
Guillermo Orea
Magda Guzmán
Carmen Montejo
María Conesa
Amparo Villegas
Jesús Valero

References 

Mexican telenovelas
1965 telenovelas
Televisa telenovelas
Spanish-language telenovelas
1965 Mexican television series debuts
1965 Mexican television series endings